"A Song of Joy" ("Himno de la alegría") is the title of a popular rock song by the Spanish singer and actor Miguel Ríos. It is set to the tune the Ninth Symphony by Ludwig van Beethoven, as arranged by Waldo de los Ríos, who specialized in arranging classical music to contemporary rhythms. 
The same melody is used in the well-known Christian hymn, "Joyful, Joyful We Adore Thee."

The single was enormously popular in many countries in 1970 (see 1970 in music), reaching number 1 on music charts in Australia, Canada, Germany, Switzerland, and the Easy Listening chart in the United States. On the U.S. pop chart, the song peaked at number 14 and was the only Top 40 hit for Ríos. In the United Kingdom, it reached number 16 on the British pop chart. In Germany, the song is the most successful pop hymn ever.
The single sold over four million copies worldwide.

Chart history

Weekly charts

Year-end charts

See also
List of number-one singles in Australia during the 1970s
List of RPM number-one singles of 1970
List of number-one hits of 1970 and 1971 (Germany)
List of number-one hits of 1970 (Switzerland)
List of number-one adult contemporary singles of 1970 (U.S.)

References

External links
European 7" single release info Discogs

1969 songs
1970 singles
Number-one singles in Australia
RPM Top Singles number-one singles
Number-one singles in Germany
Number-one singles in Switzerland
CONMEBOL music